Sedulia is a genus of grasshoppers in the subfamily Catantopinae, not assigned to any tribe. Species can be found in peninsular Malaysia and other parts of Malesia (records are probably incomplete).

Similar genera include the recently differentiated: Anasedulia, Leosedulia and Striatosedulia. A key to species and closely related genera is given by Tan et al. who state that "Southeast Asia is a highly biodiverse region with many species of grasshoppers described since the 19th century. Historical species descriptions are however often not comprehensive and do not meet the modern criteria of taxonomy. Previously used characters for identification need to be re-examined."

Species
The Orthoptera Species File. lists:
Sedulia perakensis Willemse, 1932
Sedulia specularia Stål, 1875 - type species (as Traulia specularia Stål)

References

External links 
 Singapore Biodiversity Online: Sedulia specularia (Stål, 1875)
 

Orthoptera of Asia
Catantopinae